Kouandjio is a surname. Notable people with the surname include:

Arie Kouandjio (born 1992), American football player
Cyrus Kouandjio (born 1993), American football player